Pyrrhulina laeta, known as the half-banded pyrrhulina or half-lined pyrrhulina, is a fish found near Pebas, Peru, and in tributaries of the Ampiyacu River. It is frequently confused with other species.

Physical appearance
The ocellated dorsal fin is the most attractive attribute. The back is pale olive, becoming silvery toward the belly. A fine, black line runs from the snout, across the eye to the end of the gill cover, then thickens to a wide band along the body, which suggests its common name, the half-banded pyrrulina. Other fins show blushes of red.

In captivity
A mature male has a more elongated upper caudal fin lobe than the mature female. No record exists of breeding this species in captivity, but the feat is believed possible.  The species is not attractive enough to warrant a thorough and intensive effort at breeding, yet with the great contrast of breeding habits in this family it might be interesting to try to induce them to spawn in captivity.

References

Lebiasinidae
Fish of South America
Taxa named by Edward Drinker Cope
Fish described in 1872